Pompeo Fattor (14 December 1933 – 5 May 2009) was an Italian cross-country skier. He competed at the 1956 Winter Olympics and the 1960 Winter Olympics.

References

External links
 

1933 births
2009 deaths
Italian male cross-country skiers
Olympic cross-country skiers of Italy
Cross-country skiers at the 1956 Winter Olympics
Cross-country skiers at the 1960 Winter Olympics
Sportspeople from the Province of Belluno